The Path Which Led Me To Leninism is a short essay by Vietnamese President Ho Chi Minh that describes his first encounter with Lenin's analysis of the colonial question and his ultimate acceptance of Marxism-Leninism and communist revolution. Throughout the essay, Ho Chi Minh describes his experiences in the French Communist Party and details his personal acceptance of Marxism–Leninism. The essay is notable throughout Vietnam and within Marxist circles for its endorsement of Leninism and anti-Imperialism.

References

External links 
  The Path Which Led Me To Leninism on the Marxists Internet Archive

Works by Ho Chi Minh
1960 essays